CPIX may refer to:

 Consumer price index (South Africa)
 Network Processing Forum, previously known as the Common Programming Interface Forum
 Continental Polymers, Inc., Railway reporting mark CPIX
 Cumberland Pharmaceuticals, Inc., NASDAQ
 Content Protection Information eXchange, specification by DASH-IF to exchange keys and DRM information